Death is a fictional character in Terry Pratchett's Discworld series and a parody of several other personifications of death. Like most Grim Reapers, he is a black-robed skeleton who usually carries a scythe. His jurisdiction is specifically the Discworld itself; he is only a part, or minion, of Azrael: the universal Death. He has been generally used by Pratchett to explore the problems of human existence, and has become more sympathetic throughout the series.

Works
Death has appeared in every Discworld novel, with the exception of The Wee Free Men and Snuff, and had a possible cameo at the end of Johnny and the Dead (the character was not identified, but spoke in unquoted small caps as Death does in the rest of the series). The Discworld books in which Death is a leading character, starting with Mort in 1987, are:
Mort – 1987
Reaper Man – 1991
Soul Music – 1994
Hogfather – 1996
Thief of Time – 2001

Character
Death's hollow, peculiar voice is represented in the books by unquoted ; since he is a skeleton, he has no vocal cords to speak with, and therefore his words enter a person's head with no involvement from the ears. His "voice" is often described using a morbid metaphor, such as two slabs of granite being rubbed together, or the slamming of coffin lids; these descriptions have become less frequent in later novels. In the first Discworld novel, The Colour of Magic, as well as in Eric, all pronouns referring to Death are capitalized; thus, for example, "he" is written as "He". This is usually reserved for the Discworld gods and is not featured in any of the other novels.

Death is not invisible, however most people's brains refuse to acknowledge him for who he is, unless he insists. Under normal circumstances, only those of a magical disposition (e.g. witches and wizards), children, and cats can see him, or allow themselves to see him. Due to his eternal nature, Death can ignore such things as walls and magic spells; he exists throughout all time, so things lasting merely centuries are not as real as he is. He can adjust time with regard to himself and others near him, completing tasks very rapidly from a normal perspective. He can only go where people believe in death and can only see people who can die. In this sense, he is similar to the gods of the Discworld, in that he is powered by mortals' collective belief in him.

Wizards, witches, and significant figures such as kings have the prerogative of being collected by Death himself, rather than one of the lesser entities. Most other souls are collected by another functionary, such as the anthropomorphic personification of scrofula. Death himself must collect some minimum number of souls, worked out by a system called the "nodes", in order to keep the momentum of dying going. His selection of ordinary deaths may be based on the showiness of the death, such as a common thief being incinerated by a dragon. In addition to wizards and kings, he has shown up for numerous ordinary people, at least two dogs, at least two kittens, a swan, and a red, flower-like sea creature. These events are usually of importance within the story, so Death's appearance may simply be considered a plot device. He has also appeared in situations where characters are in mortal peril; for example, Death has appeared before Rincewind on numerous nearly-fatal occasions. Similarly, in Thud! Samuel Vimes has a near-death experience, which means that Death has a corresponding "near-Vimes experience", in which he appears before the stricken Vimes sitting in a deckchair reading a mystery novel.

He is fond of cats, who can see him at all times (he seems particularly furious when he once attends to a sack of drowned kittens), and curry, the consumption of which he describes as like biting a red-hot ice cube. Being a skeleton with no digestive organs, it is not revealed how he is able to partake of food and drink. Anyone who dines with him tends to become extremely focused upon their own meal, and merely notices Death's plate being full one moment and empty the next. He occasionally smokes a pipe, with the smoke drifting out of his eye sockets. He pays for goods and services with an assortment of copper coins, many turned blue or green with age, which he says he acquired .

Death is fascinated by humanity. His interest is coupled with bafflement: it's a favorite point of Pratchett's that the habits and beliefs that are grown into instead of being rationally acquired are an essential part of being human. As Death is an outside observer, his imitations of humanity are intricate but marked by a fundamental lack of comprehension. He is especially intrigued by humanity's ability to complicate their own existence, and their ability to actually get up in the morning without going insane from the sheer prospect of what life entails (from his perspective).

This fascination with humanity extends to the point of sympathy towards them, and he will often side with humans against greater threats, notably the Auditors of Reality. He has on a number of occasions bent the rules to allow a character extra life (e.g., the little girl rescued from the fire in Reaper Man, or the Little Match Girl in Hogfather). Death has also indicated that he will oblige dying humans by playing a game with them for their lives, much like the personification of Death in The Seventh Seal; the games he offers include chess, though he consistently has trouble remembering how the knights move, and another game (referred to by Death as "Exclusive Possession" in the book, presumably based on Monopoly), which the challenger lost despite having "three streets and all the utilities". Granny Weatherwax was able to play cards against Death in a successful bid to save a child's life, Granny's hand having four queens while Death's had only four "ones". (A hand of four aces would generally beat a hand of queens in poker, but Death chose to consider them low, giving the old witch a "wink" in the process.)

In the same way that his granddaughter, Susan, has been described as "Helpfulness Personified" in terms of her personality, Death, by his own admission, could very well be described as 'Duty Personified' in terms of personality; in Hogfather, in a discussion with Albert, Death comments  He does not cause people to die, nor does he concern himself with their goodness or badness in life; it is simply his job to collect their souls at the appointed time. 

In many ways, he epitomizes the bleakness of human existence. In Reaper Man, in which he is rendered temporarily mortal (or at least the imagination of being mortal, since his state of being "it/death" is, as mentioned in Discworld Noir, constant), he becomes frustrated and infuriated with the unfair inevitability of death, a theme that continues through later books. In Soul Music he expresses misery at the fact that he is capable of preventing deaths but is forbidden to do so; during his time as the Hogfather, he uses his new dual role to save a little match girl from dying of the cold by employing a loophole through giving her the 'gift' of a future, thus allowing him to avoid the usual complications that arise from him "breaking the rules". Despite his general lack of emotion, the Auditors of Reality are one of the few things actually capable of angering him. He also gets angry upon hearing of Rincewind: In Eric, for example, his eyes turn red at the mention of Rincewind. Pratchett even says in The Art of Discworld that he has received a number of letters from terminally ill fans in which they hope that Death will resemble the Discworld incarnation (he also says that those particular letters usually cause him to spend some time staring at the wall).

Death has developed considerably since his first appearance in The Colour of Magic. In this, he was quite a malicious character and followed Rincewind around wanting him to die after circumstances resulted in Rincewind missing his scheduled 'appointment'. At one point he even deliberately stops a character's heart, though later in the book it was shown to have been the actions of Death's "stand-in", Scrofula. By the time of Mort he had gained the sympathetic and humorous personality he has in later books. In later novels he has been used to examine developments in theoretical physics as, being supernatural, he is able to witness such events firsthand although, being a cat lover, he is not fond of the Schrödinger's cat thought experiment, believing it cruel to the cats involved.

Home
Death resides in an extra-dimensional realm called Death's Domain. His home within the domain looks like a Victorian house with a garden that is well-tended, but is predominantly in shades of black and decorated with a skull and crossbones motif. It is called "Mon Repos", (Quirmian for "my place of rest"), and is much larger on the inside, because Death has not quite mastered the art of scale. Similarly, because he does not quite understand real distance compared to perspective, the surrounding terrain is actually relatively close, but blurred to appear farther away. Death adds a large golden wheat field to the grounds after the events of Reaper Man. There is also a tree swing, created by Death for his granddaughter Susan, which swings through the trunk of the tree.

In addition to the inside of the house being larger than the outside, there are doors that reach a height of several yards and at the same time are only a few feet tall. He has a bathroom which he never uses, with a bar of bone-white, rock-hard soap and a towel rack with hard towels attached to it. The only usable items in the bathroom are a small bar of regular soap and one normal towel, both brought there by his manservant Albert.

The plumbing of his house has greatly confused him, and in Death's Domain it is explained that the pipes are completely solid, as is the u-bend for the floral-decorated toilet. The towels he originally constructed are also useless; he did not realize that they had to bend, fold and be soft. In his 'bedroom' (which he never actually sleeps in), he has a violin, which he attempts to play. As with everything in his domain, he cannot create, only mimic, so he creates a racket, instead of music. He does note in Soul Music that the only piece he can play that could be remotely considered music is "an empty chord," and is the sound made at the end of everything to signify that no more sound will be made. This is said to greatly frustrate him.

Furthermore, Death's house is full of cats, roaming around. Moreover, he is also responsible for sending cats to Heaven as mentioned in "The Amazing Maurice and his Educated Rodents" where Maurice encounters Death himself.

Death's gender
The initial books did not pronounce themselves about the sex of Death, although Ysabell called him 'Daddy', using the pronoun "it". In Mort Death's pronoun is given as "he" and "his" without the special capital as in the earlier books. In Reaper Man, Death is unambiguously identified as a male, and in Soul Music and Hogfather Susan calls him her grandfather or "Granddad". When asked to describe Death, in the second Discworld computer game, the protagonist Rincewind hazards a guess, "Well, I suppose he's a man. You have to look at the pelvis, don't you?" In the comic strip adaptation of Mort, Death is seen in mirrors as a black-bearded human wearing a black cloak, a look he takes when he needs to be seen by the living.

Many languages must provide a grammatical gender to each object, and 'death' is often a feminine noun. As such, translations of early novels sometimes refer to Death as a woman. This is generally changed, by the time of Reaper Man. Also, the personification of Death varies from country to country leading to further confusion, for example the Russian personification is that of an old woman, the Czech version uses for his name a normally nonexistent masculine variant of the feminine word for death. Explanations are given in footnotes, often with a pun.

Relations and associates
Death is both the servant and a part of The Old High One known as Azrael, the Death of Universes and ruler of all deaths.

In the earlier books and in Thief of Time Death works with War, Pestilence, and Famine, three other Horsemen of the Apocralypse. Like him they have become more human than their roles require. Death himself explains this in Thief of Time by saying that "form defines function." In Thief of Time they are reunited with Kaos, the Fifth Horseman, who had previously left before the group became famous and now works as a milkman under the name Ronnie Soak. With the exception of Thief of Time, the other Horsemen do not generally appear in the books focused on Death.

Lord Mortimer, Duke of Sto Helit

"Mort", short for Mortimer but also meaning 'death' in Quirmian (and also in French), is the title character in Mort. He is first seen as the overly-thoughtful son of a farmer in the Octarine Grass Country near the Ramtops. Having proved himself unworthy as a scarecrow he is chosen by Death to be his apprentice. Mort's father gave his consent, mistaking Death for an undertaker. Mort is described as being very tall and skinny, with muscles like knots in string. He has a shock of bright red hair, and walks as if he is made entirely of knees.

Mort starts off at the bottom, learning to accept his position while mucking out the stables, and trying to ignore Ysabell, Death's adopted daughter. When Death feels in need of a break, Mort takes over The Duty. Unfortunately for Mort, his feelings for a teenage princess of Sto Lat get in the way of his job and he starts off a chain reaction of events by impulsively preventing her assassination. Reluctant to tell his master about his gaffe, Mort tries various unsuccessful methods to fix the situation. After fighting and losing to Death, Mort is given an extra lease on life when the Grim Reaper chooses to turn over his Lifetimer, allowing Mort to stay in the world of the living.

After the events of Mort, Mort leaves Death's service and marries Ysabell. The couple are given the title of Duke and Duchess of Sto Helit, and they later become the parents of Susan Sto Helit. They subsequently meet their end after a freak accident sends their carriage plunging into a ravine, as revealed in Soul Music. They had discussed this with Death and had turned down his offer to extend the duration of their existence by letting them stay in his domain, on the grounds that it would not be the same as actually lengthening their lives.

In The Light Fantastic, Rincewind overhears Twoflower teaching the Four Horsemen of the Apocalypse, (Death, Famine, Pestilence and War) how to play bridge. At one point, War calls out Death with "Mort" but we later learn that the only people in the room (other than Twoflower) were Death, Famine, Pestilence and War.

In the Cosgrove Hall Films animation of Soul Music, Mort is voiced by Neil Morrissey. In 2004 BBC Radio 4 adapted Mort, with the title character voiced by Carl Prekopp and Ysabell being voiced by Clare Corbett. Mort is included in Wayne Barlowe's Barlowe's Guide to Fantasy.

Lady Ysabell, Duchess of Sto Helit

Ysabell is the adopted daughter of Death, who saved her as a baby when her parents were killed in the Great Nef desert (no explanation has been given as to why he did this; Ysabell said that "He didn't feel sorry for me, he never feels anything. ... He probably thought sorry for me."). When first encountered she is a sixteen-year-old girl with silver hair and silver eyes who, it transpires, has been sixteen for thirty-five Discworld 'years' due to the fact that no time passes in Death's Domain. During her encounter with Rincewind (see below), her behaviour is sufficiently flamboyant as to cause him to believe she is "bonkers". When Mort first encountered Ysabell, he was given the impression of "too many chocolates" (though Pratchett notes that he would have described her as "Pre-Raphaelite" if he had ever heard the word). She also has a fixation for the colour pink.

Ysabell first appeared in The Light Fantastic, where she met Rincewind, and was surprised to learn that he was not actually dead. This state of affairs might not have continued long if the Luggage had not intervened. During the events of Mort it became clear that Ysabell was competent in carrying out the work of her father including The Duty and 'doing the nodes'. This mainly involves figuring out which deaths needed to be attended to personally, an important aspect of all reality. Before Mort arrived she shared her home with Albert, Death's manservant.

Lady Susan, Duchess of Sto Helit

Susan Sto Helit is Mort and Ysabell's daughter and only child. When she first appears as a schoolgirl in Soul Music, Susan has just inherited the duchy on the death of her parents. From the time she was a small child until the start of the book, when she is sixteen, her parents have hidden her background from her and brought her up to be logical, and it comes as a shock when the Death of Rats and Quoth the Raven come looking for her. She has to act as a stand-in for Death when he disappears, but subsequently returns to her education. Despite the fact that she has inherited all of her grandfather's abilities, she longs to be normal, and gets human jobs, first as a governess (in Hogfather), and then as a schoolteacher (in Thief of Time). Death is constantly dragging her back into the world of the occult. At the end of Thief of Time, she begins a relationship with Lobsang Ludd, the anthropomorphic personification of Time.

Albert

Albert (originally known as Alberto Malich) is Death's manservant, butler, and cook. Once a wizard and founder of the Unseen University, he attempted to gain immortality by reciting the Rite of AshkEnte (a ritual to summon Death) backwards, believing this would force Death to stay away from him. Instead it brought him directly to Death's Domain. Since time in Death's Domain does not flow in the same way as it does on the Discworld, Albert succeeded, in a way, in gaining immortality. Before returning to the world during Mort, "Albert" had 91 days, three hours and five minutes of time left on the Disc, most of which he spent shopping and using the soap and baths at the "Young Men's Reformed Cultist of the Ichor-God-Bel-Shamharoth's Association" (Death is not very good at plumbing). After Soul Music, he has only a few seconds left, and can no longer leave Death's Domain. Albert is a highly idiosyncratic cook, believing everything needs to be fried to get rid of the germs, including porridge.

Albert's childhood was touched upon lightly in Hogfather, revealing that he comes from a very poor family (even by Ankh-Morpork standards). This novel also suggests that he is fond of pork pies with mustard and drinking sherry.

There was a statue of Alberto in the hallway of Unseen University, inscribed (apart from the usual student scribbles) with "We Shall Not See His Like Again." This, of course, turns out to be entirely wrong. After the destruction of the statue in Mort, and the wizards' belief that the returned Albert was the statue, it is suggested that a new one be built in a very secure place—such as the dungeon (allegedly to prevent it being defiled by students). Alberto Malich was a powerful wizard, perhaps the most powerful a wizard can be (though not likely a Sourcerer). This is reflected in how easily Albert devised a spell to slow the passage of time (a near-impossible feat with Discworld magic) indefinitely around a small area.

When Death goes missing in Soul Music, Albert tries to find him on the Disc, but gets robbed and his life-timer (hourglass of life) is broken. After this incident, Albert has approximately 34 seconds left, and thus cannot return to the world of the living any more, as Death cannot make his life longer. The remaining sand is now kept in a bottle in Albert's bedroom. Albert is able to temporarily return to the Discworld during the events of Hogfather, although in this instance he merely inhabits the pseudo-reality created for the Hogfather to allow him to travel around the entire world in a single night, and hence is not actually in the world, strictly speaking.

While Death and Albert seem to get on rather well, it is a fragile relationship. In Mort, Albert returns to the world to help Death, but seems ready to attack him when it looks like he has his former job as Archchancellor back. He also seems not to trust Death with his life-timer, which is why he takes it with him in Soul Music, despite Death later reflecting that such an action was pointless as he would never have done anything to it. Frequently, Albert finds himself trying to keep Death "on course" when his master becomes too human. He and Susan do not get on very well.

Binky
Binky is Death's steed, named so by Death because it is "a nice name". He is a living horse; Death tried a skeletal steed, but kept having to "stop and wire bits back on". Death also tried a fiery steed, but it repeatedly set his barn and his robe on fire.

Binky is rather more intelligent than most horses and is pure, milky and white (it is noted in some novels that Binky is an exception to the biological rule of "grey" equines). He can fly by just creating his own ground-level, as well as travel through time and across dimensions, sometimes leaving glowing hoofprints in his wake, but is in all other respects a perfectly ordinary horse. He is well-treated, and loyal to his master and Susan. His shoeing is done by Jason Ogg, the Lancrastian blacksmith of mythical skill. Binky is not immortal, but while in Death's service does not age. Binky gains part of his powers by sharing one of Death's qualities: he's so much "realer" than ordinary things such as walls, great distances, or time that he can simply ignore them.

Death gave Susan a "My Little Binky" gift set for her third birthday. It was returned by her parents, fearing that it would make her a less "normal" child.

The Death of Rats
The Death of Rats, also known as the Grim Squeaker, is not, strictly speaking, a personification in his own right but rather an aspect of Death allowed an independent existence. His purpose is to usher on the souls of dead rodents, as well as assisting Death in other ways. His jurisdiction also seems to cover certain kinds of "ratty" humans, such as Mr. Clete in Soul Music, Mr. Pin in The Truth, and Mr. Pounder in Maskerade.

He was one of a disparate multitude of death-personifications created during Death's absence in Reaper Man. The Death of Rats refused to be reabsorbed into Death himself upon the latter's resumption of his duties; therefore Death kept him around for company. The Death of Fleas also escaped resorption, but has not been seen since Reaper Man. The Death of Rats resembles a rodentine skeleton walking on its hind legs, wearing a black robe, and carrying a tiny scythe, his form having taken shape from the latent form of Death himself in Reaper Man, as he came into existence in the vicinity of Bill Door.

The Death of Rats more easily finds ways around the rules than Death does, and has assisted Susan in Soul Music, Hogfather, and Thief of Time. He sometimes travels with a talking raven named Quoth who also acts as his translator.

In the mythology of the Changeling Clan in The Amazing Maurice and his Educated Rodents the Death of Rats is known as the Bone Rat.

Quoth

Quoth is a talking raven who accompanies the Death of Rats. He was named Quoth by his previous owner, a wizard with no sense of humour who was attempting to make a joke by referencing the famous line in "The Raven" by Edgar Allan Poe. Quoth refuses to give in to this stereotype by saying "the N word" (Nevermore). At times he acts as steed and interpreter for the Death of Rats. He has a constant craving for eyeballs (a reference to ravens pecking the eyes out of corpses) and frequently mistakes various other objects for eyeballs, such as olives and walnuts. He was originally one of the ravens from the Tower of Art, the magical properties of which gave him his ability to speak.

He was first seen in Soul Music, and since then has made appearances in all novels involving Susan Sto Helit. Neil Pearson voices him in the Sky One adaptation of Hogfather.

New Death
The New Death appears in Reaper Man when he comes to collect the old Death, then known as "Bill Door". The New Death is the old Death's replacement as a result of the plot by the Auditors to rid the world of sloppy thinking.

The New Death comes from human belief, but is quite different from the original, having been formed from modern Discworlders who think of death as being a malevolent force rather than the simple cessation of life. Though he has the usual black robe, he is larger and has only smoke underneath his robe, rather than bones, and wears a crown, to the disgust of the original Death. He rides the classic skeletal steed, in contrast to the special, but nevertheless very real, Binky. Instead of a scythe he wields a weapon "which may, at some point in its evolution, have incorporated aspects of a scythe, in the same way a scalpel incorporated aspects of a stick". In place of a face or skull, the new Death just has a crown and is prideful, dramatic, cold, and cruel; the literal embodiment of humanity's fear of death. He chooses to arrive exactly at midnight and appears in a flash of lightning purely for the dramatic effect, something the old Death finds demeaning and rather excessive. When he corners Bill Door, he mocks him and beats him instead of finishing the job.

The new Death is destroyed by Bill Door, using the scythe he used on the farm; a humble garden tool, not the infinitely sharp implement of Death, but sharpened by his rage and the harvest. Bill Door was disgusted and horrified by the New Death's callous attitude toward humanity, and his victory is the triumph of the compassionate "reaper man" over the tyrant who has no care for the harvest.

Rite of AshkEnte
The Rite of AshkEnte (also Ashk'Ente or Ash'Kente) is the ancient magic ritual that summons and binds Death into a circle and prevents him from leaving until invited to do so by the summoning wizard. This may be wishful thinking on the part of the wizards as, in Eric, Death appears outside the circle, behind the wizards, and in Reaper Man a wizard comments that he believes Death only stays in the circle for the look of the thing. The Rite is not tuned to Death himself, but rather whoever happened to be doing the job; Mort (then Death's apprentice) was almost forced to respond to the summons, and Susan Sto Helit (his granddaughter) was summoned and subsequently bound. The rite does not appear to apply to Death himself, although he may just appear out of politeness.

Since Death is professionally involved in almost everything that is going on everywhere, the Rite is usually performed so that he can be questioned on otherwise inexplicable phenomena. This is usually done only when all other avenues have been exhausted as most powerful wizards are quite old and therefore unwilling to attract the attention of Death. Death hates being summoned because he is always summoned at the "worst possible time", such as when he is at a party.

The Rite is also the reason for Albert's affiliation with Death; while he was still Archchancellor of Unseen University, Albert attempted to become immortal by performing the Rite backwards, reasoning that this would banish Death away from him, but instead it transferred Albert to Death's realm, where he decided to remain on the grounds that time did not pass in Death's realm and he is thus essentially immortal.

There are twelve ways of performing the Rite, but eight of them cause instant death, and so might just be considered to summon Death in the "usual" manner, and the ninth is very hard to remember. This leaves three ways to safely summon death: Although the Rite can be performed by a couple of people with three small sticks and 4 cc of mouse blood or even with a fresh egg and only two small sticks, the wizards (Ridcully excepted) prefer to do it the old fashioned way, with heavy equipment consisting of numerous drippy candles, octograms written on the floor, thuribles, and similar paraphernalia. They feel it's not "proper" wizardry if it's not showy enough.

In the Discworld books, the Rite has been used several times:
In The Light Fantastic, Death was summoned to be asked about the recent mass wave of magic that had apparently done nothing, revealing that the Octavo had taken action to prevent the eighth spell dropping off the Disc so that all eight spells could be used to prevent the imminent destruction of the world. Death later returned to collect one of the high ranking wizards present at the Rite as his time had run out. (The wizard, realising his time was near, locked himself in a room sealed both magically and physically against all ills. In a later book, it is noted doing so probably makes you more likely to be found by Death.)
In Mort, Albert, briefly returned to the world, summoned Death, who was having a holiday, to let him know that Mort, his apprentice, was doing a terrible job as replacement. While the Rite was being performed, it almost summoned Mort instead.
In Eric, Death was asked about an occult disturbance that turned out to be Rincewind. On this occasion, Death appeared outside of the binding octogram, walking into it only at the insistence of the gathered wizards.
In Reaper Man, when Death had been forced to retire by the Auditors, an Auditor appeared in Death's place to inform the wizards about the situation and, when they asked about the sudden abundance of life force, assuring them that 'normal service' would resume shortly.
In Soul Music, when Death had again taken a break from work, the Rite instead summoned his granddaughter Susan, who was filling in.
The Rite is also used in the computer game Discworld 2. The game requires the player to find not only the three small sticks (of equal length) and 4 cc of mouse blood mentioned above, but also dribbly candles, a vile stench, and some glitter. During the ritual, the wizards perform an off-key version of "Day-O (Banana Boat Song)" and Death appears behind them, fresh from vacation, wearing a cork hat.

Appearances in other media

Television

Animated
In the 1997 animated adaptations of Soul Music and Wyrd Sisters, Death was voiced by Christopher Lee.

Live-action
In the 2006 Sky One adaptation of Hogfather he was voiced by Ian Richardson. The actor who played the physical Death in Hogfather was Marnix van den Broeke, a 6-foot 7 inch tall Dutchman.

In the 2008 adaptation of The Colour of Magic, van den Broeke reprises the physical role, with Lee returning to the voice after the death of Richardson.

In the 2021 series The Watch, Wendell Pierce voices Death.

Radio
Death has been voiced in all five BBC Radio adaptations of Discworld novels. Geoffrey Whitehead played the part in the adaptation of Mort, and also in Episode 1 of Eric. John Rowe played him in The Amazing Maurice and His Educated Rodents, and Michael Kilgarriff voiced Death in Episode 4 of Small Gods. In both Guards! Guards! and Wyrd Sisters, Death is credited as being played by himself (In Guards! Guards! he is actually voiced by Stephen Thorne who also played Sergeant Colon).

Computer games
Death has appeared in various other media: in the Discworld Game Series he is voiced firstly by Rob Brydon and later by Nigel Planer.

Theatre
Death has also been played by numerous actors in amateur stage productions of Wyrd Sisters, Mort, Soul Music, and Hogfather, as well as various other plays based on the novels.

Internet culture
After his death in March 2015, Pratchett's daughter Rhianna wrote in three tweets from her father's Twitter account:

Fans launched a tongue-in-cheek petition on Change.org, requesting for Death to return Pratchett to life because, "Terry Pratchett turned Death from a figure of hate into a much loved and sometimes welcomed character. No-one else cared about you Death. You owe him!"

Associates of Death: In other media

The Death of Rats
The Death of Rats has appeared in the animated Soul Music and in the radio play of The Amazing Maurice and His Educated Rodents, but has not been given a voice credit for either. In the Hogfather TV series the voice was credited to Dorckey Hellmice (an anagram of Michelle Dockery who played Susan Sto Helit in the same TV series), while in the Discworld 2 game, the voice is credited as Katherine the Crocodile. The Death of Rats also appears in Discworld Noir.

Albert
In Cosgrove Hall's 1996 animated Soul Music, Albert was voiced by Bryan Pringle. In BBC Radio 4's 2004 adaptation of Mort, he was voiced by Philip Jackson.

In Sky One's live-action version of Hogfather, Albert was played by David Jason.

Albert also makes an appearance in the computer game Discworld 2: Missing Presumed...!?, voiced by Nigel Planer.

See also
Death (DC Comics), another fictional Death with sympaphetic traits
List of death deities
Psychopomp
Azrael
Thanatos
Pale Horseman, one of the Four Horsemen of the Apocalypse, also named Thanatos
Charon

References

External links
Discworld & Pratchett Wiki
Deaths reading order - A guide to Deaths story arc.

Discworld characters
Literary characters introduced in 1983
Fictional personifications of death
Fictional skeletons

de:Figuren und Schauplätze der Scheibenwelt-Romane#Tod